Bi is the sixth studio album by American-Argentinian singer-songwriter Kevin Johansen, released on 18 June 2012 by Sony Music. Made up by two discs: Jogo (Subtropicalia) recorded in Del Arco studio; and Fogo (Pop Heart) recorded in El Pie studios.

The album expresses the duality of the author Heritage and upbringing. Jogo represents his mother's side, his Latin-American folk. Fogo is closer to his father side, pop-rock.

Track listing

References 

2012 albums
Kevin Johansen albums